The Pomilio BVL-12 was an American experimental single-engine biplane bomber built by the United States Army Engineering Division to the design of Ottorino Pomilio for the United States Army Air Corps after World War I.

Powered by a 400 hp (298 kW) Liberty V12, it would seat two. It featured an equal-span wing, the lower of the pair attached to the fuselage by struts, unique in the United States, rather than directly, which was more usual.  Performance proved disappointing, and only six trial models were built.

Operators

United States Army Air Corps

Specifications

See also

References

Notes

Bibliography

 Donald, David, ed. Encyclopedia of World Aircraft. Etobicoke, ON: Prospero Books, 1997. .

External links
 "Engineering Division - BVL-12"Aerofiles, photo of BVL-12.

BVL-12
1910s United States bomber aircraft
Single-engined tractor aircraft
Biplanes
Aircraft first flown in 1919